Scitech is a not-for-profit company operating as the Scitech Science Centre, a permanent, interactive science museum which includes a planetarium in West Perth, Western Australia.

The organisation's published mission is "to increase awareness, interest, capability and participation by all Western Australians in science, technology, engineering and mathematics".

Scitech’s range of programs and exhibits are designed for children from early childhood to Year 12, with many tailored towards the primary school age bracket. They also host events for adults such as “Scitech After Dark” several times a year.

Scitech Science Centre 
The Scitech Science Centre features a number of regularly changing, interactive exhibitions designed to inform and educate visitors on subjects concerning science, technology, engineering and maths (STEM). It also offers live science, puppet and planetarium shows presented by enthusiastic science presenters.

Large feature exhibitions are rotated every six months, with STEM exhibits pertaining to a particular theme, storyline or concept, most of which are built in-house by Scitech's design, graphics, and workshop departments. Scitech was the first Australian science centre to build large-scale interactive exhibitions. In addition, the exhibitions Scitech creates have toured nationally to Sydney, Melbourne, Adelaide, Brisbane and Darwin. Internationally, exhibitions have toured to Singapore, United Kingdom, Hong Kong, New Zealand, Finland, France, Portugal, Estonia, Norway, Kuwait, Saudi Arabia and North American venues.

Scitech engages more than 500,000 Western Australians in STEM every year, plus many more people online and around the world. 300,000 general public visitors and 42,000 primary and secondary school children visit the Scitech Discovery Centre annually at its West Perth base, with another 200,000 people experiencing Scitech via its travelling roadshow known as Statewide.

Funding 
Support for Scitech's programs and services comes from government funding, corporate sponsorship, rental of travelling exhibitions, admission and membership fees, and other supporting services.

Scitech Planetarium 

In 2004, Scitech leased the empty Omni Max Theatre and rebranded it as "Horizon – The Planetarium" with a substantial refit. Entrance to the planetarium was not included in the ticket price for Scitech and separate tickets were needed. This was dropped a few years later.

The 70mm IMAX projector, platter system and associated Spitz spherical star map system were removed in 2004, and kept in storage. Sky-Skan were chosen to carry out the upgrades to the Planetarium by installing 6 Barco 909 projectors for high quality astronomy, full-dome shows and also for the live element of each presentation. The presenter would be based at the front of the planetarium and have full control over real-time astronomy visualisations.

In September 2013, the planetarium was closed for a $1.4m renovation that was funded by a grant from Lotterywest. New projectors, servers, lighting, wiring and various communications devices were included in the upgrade.

The Scitech Planetarium has a diameter of 18m and still remains the largest in the Southern Hemisphere. It has two Sony TX–T420 projectors using ultra-wide angle lenses custom made for Scitech. These projectors fill the full 180 degrees of the night sky in 4K 60fps detail. The Scitech Planetarium uses an azimuth speaker channel for ceiling effects and has a 6.1 surround sound system.

The planetarium is popular with passing tourists, members of the public, private events and school groups ranging from pre-primary up to grade 12. It has approximately 135,000 visitors a year.

Scitech Statewide 
Scitech's Statewide department is the travelling arm of the organisation that takes Scitech's educational early childhood, science, technology and careers programs to over 200,000 people across Western Australia. In the 2015-2016 fiscal year, Scitech Statewide visited 154 communities across Western Australia.

Expansion and relocation 
The Scitech Discovery Centre has remained at its City West premises since it was established in 1988. It underwent major renovation works in May 2017, with the company’s administration staff moving into another building in the City West complex. The vacant areas were redeveloped with a larger floor space for exhibits, a new cafe area with views of the Perth Skyline, a new CSIRO Lab and a new Science Theatre.

In August 2016 the WA state government announced Scitech would be moving to the Perth Cultural Centre in 2021 along with the WA Museum refurbishment. This plan was redefined following the 2017 state election with the new State Government announcing they would be working “with Scitech to facilitate its relocation to new state-of-the-art accommodation”.

Scitech’s new premises is planned to open between 2021 and 2023 with a ‘state-of-the-art’ premises with a modern, purpose-built visitor centre.

Scitech professional development 
Scitech’s professional learning team are experienced teachers in STEM fields, who provide support to teachers with interactive workshops and classroom collaborations. Working across Western Australia offer a range of interactive workshops in science, design technology, coding, robotics, maths, and the integrated curriculum.

Their workshops are designed to suit the needs of any group, and may be recognised as professional learning with the Teacher Registration Board of Western Australia.

Memberships 
Scitech is a member of these associations of science centres:

 Asia Pacific Network of Science and Technology Centres (ASPAC).
 Association of Science-Technology Centers (ASTC).
 The European Collaborative for Science, Industry and Technology (ECSITE).
 The Network of Australasian Museum Exhibitors (NAME)

See also 

 List of science museums

References 

Museums in Perth, Western Australia
1988 establishments in Australia
Science museums in Australia
Association of Science-Technology Centers member institutions